Patricia Ann "Pat" Jones (born 20 June 1942) is a British former track and field hurdler who mostly competed in the 80 metres hurdles.

Born in Croydon, England, Jones became a member of Birchfield Harriers, a Birmingham-based athletic club. She made two high-profile international appearances in the 80 metres hurdles during her career: she was runner-up to East Germany's Karin Balzer at the 1967 European Cup, and represented her country at the 1968 Summer Olympics (being eliminated in the first round). She also won the 1967 European Cup semi-final with a best of 10.6 seconds, which ranked her eighth in the world for the discipline that year.

At national level, Jones won multiple hurdles titles at the WAAA Championships, three over 80 metres, two in the 100 metres hurdles, and three in the 200 metres hurdles. She was also runner-up to Olympic winner Mary Peters in the WAAA women's pentathlon in 1965. She also competed at the AAA Indoor Championships and though she never won a title there she reached the 60-yard hurdles podium in 1965 and 1966, as well as the podium of the 1966 220 yards sprint. In regional competition, she had two wins in the 200 m hurdles at the North of England Athletics Championships (1962, 1963), and twelve individual wins at the Midland Counties Championships, including straight wins in the 80 m hurdles from 1964 to 1969, consecutive wins in the 200 m hurdles from 1964 to 1967, and three wins in the pentathlon between 1965 and 1968 (interrupted by Rosemary Payne in 1966).

International competitions

National titles
WAAA Championships
80 m hurdles: 1965, 1967, 1968
100 m hurdles: 1965, 1967
200 m hurdles: 1964, 1966, 1967

References

External links

1942 births
Living people
British female hurdlers
English female hurdlers
Olympic athletes of Great Britain
Athletes (track and field) at the 1968 Summer Olympics
AAA Championships winners